Trachydactylus is a genus of geckos from the Middle East.

Species
The genus Trachydactylus contains 2 recognized species.

Trachydactylus hajarensis  
Trachydactylus spatalurus 

Nota bene: A binomial authority in parentheses indicates that the species was originally described in a genus other than Trachydactylus.

References

 
Lizard genera